D. bidentata may refer to:

 Diastylis bidentata, a marine crustacean
 Dolops bidentata, a carp louse